Maria Gustafsson may refer to:

Maria Gustafsson (writer) (born 1946), Swedish actress, author and model
Maria Gustafsson (orienteer) (born 1969), Swedish orienteer

See also
Pia-Maria Gustafsson (born 1977), Finnish figure skater, competed in 1999 Finnish Figure Skating Championships
Gustafsson (disambiguation)